Princeville Township is located in Peoria County, Illinois. As of the 2010 census, its population was 1,628 and it contained 674 housing units. The township shares a border with Stark County to the North. It also borders Millbrook Township to the West, Akron Township to the East, and the Jubilee Township to the South.

Geography

Demographics

References

External links
City-data.com
Illinois State Archives

Townships in Peoria County, Illinois
Peoria metropolitan area, Illinois
Townships in Illinois